is a Japanese female arm wrestler, professional wrestler, mixed martial artist and occasional ring girl. Nicknamed  and Iron Beauty, she also works as a talent for the Tokyo-based agency .

Yamada has been the Japan Arm Wrestling Association (JAWA) female champion since 2002 and became the World Armwrestling Federation (WAF) champion in the 45 kg right hand division and second place in the left hand division in 2005.

Background
Yamada practiced swimming until 1994 and played badminton during high school. After finishing high school, she was unsure what to do next until 1999 when she, at 20 years old, met an arm wrestler in a restaurant that inspired her and made her decide to try arm wrestling.

Arm wrestling
In 2000, Yamada got the fourth place in the JAWA All-Japan Championships in the women's left hand 50 kg and women's right hand 45 kg and 50 kg divisions.

In 2001, Yamada got the third place in the JAWA All-Japan Championships in the women's right hand 50 kg category.

In 2002, Yamada got the first place in the All-Japan Championships in the women's left hand 50 kg category and second place in the right hand 50 kg category.

Yamada repeated her previous performance in 2003, this time winning in both right and left hand 50 kg categories and also placing second in both hands 55 kg categories.

Yamada placed fourth in the 50 kg category in both left and right arm classes at the WAF World Championship 2003 held in Ottawa, Ontario, Canada.

In 2004 Yamada once again won the women's right and left hand -50 kg categories and also was the runner up in the left hand -55 kg division.

Also in 2004, Yamada was third place in both left and right hand 50 kg women's divisions at the WAF World Championships held in Durban, KwaZulu-Natal, South Africa.

Continuing her winning streak, in 2005 Yamada won the 23rd All-Japan Arm Wrestling Championships in left and right hands -45 kg categories and right hand -50 kg.

At the WAF World Armwrestling Championship 2005 held in Tokyo, Japan Yamada won the 45 kg right hand division and placed second in the left hand division.

In the All-Japan championships 2006, Yamada won the first place in the women's right hand -50 kg, -55 kg, -60 kg and women's left hand -50 kg.

Yamada was unable to participate in the 2006 World Championship since the minimum weight was raised to 50 kg.

Once again dominating in the All-Japan Championships, in 2007 Yamada won in both hands in the -50 and -55 kg categories and also achieved second place in the right hand -60 kg category and fourth in the +60 kg.

In 2008 Yamada controlled all the women's categories in both hands at the All-Japan Championships, winning the first place in all categories for both hands, with the exception of the +60 kg categories where she got third place in both hands.

Yamada once again showed her dominance in the All-Japan Championships 2009, winning in both hands the -50 kg and -55 kg divisions.

In 2010 Yamada once again won the same categories that she won in 2009 performance at the 28th All-Japan Arm Wrestling Championships.

Mixed martial arts career
After watching mixed martial arts (MMA) on TV, she became interested on them. Inspired by Gary Goodridge, another arm wrestling champion that competed in MMA, Yamada elected to use Goodridge's theme, Queen's "We Will Rock You", for her MMA entrance theme.

At G-Shooto Japan 05 on  Yamada defeated Azusa Anzai in only ten seconds with an armbar submission, earning her fourth consecutive win.

Shoot boxing
On , Yamada faced Mio Tsumura alias "Mio Kubota" in a shoot boxing match at the 2011 Shoot Boxing Girls S-Cup. She was defeated by disqualification after failing to obey the referee's commands.

Professional wrestling

Yamada continues to perform occasionally as a freelancer.

Talent
Yamada works as a talent girl and is affiliated to the KT Project agency. She has appeared as a gravure model in some DVDs and photobooks.

Internet show
From  to  Yamada hosted an Internet television show called  which was produced by Internet broadcaster .

Personal life
Yamada is bisexual. She has two brothers and Yoko Minamida was her aunt.

Yamada was subjected to bullying in junior high school and it caused her to stop going to school for some time. During her teens Yamada beat the leader of a girl's gang and four of the girl's friends for which she was sent to a juvenile correctional facility.

After her parents divorced, her father disappeared for five years due to money problems occasioned by his gambling habits until he had a stroke that left him hospitalized and with cognitive problems and Yamada has taken care of him since then.

Mixed martial arts record

|-
| Win
| align=center| 6-1
| Miyoko Kusaka
| Decision (unanimous)
| Jewels 6th Ring
| 
| align=center| 2
| align=center| 5:00
| Tokyo, Japan
| 
|-
| Win
| align=center| 5-1
| Nana Ichikawa
| KO (punch)
| Deep: Glove 2
| 
| align=center| 1
| align=center| 1:00
| Tokyo, Japan
| 
|-
| Loss
| align=center| 4-1
| Maho Muranami
| Technical submission (armbar)
| Wrestle Expo 2006
| 
| align=center| 1
| align=center| 1:14
| Tokyo, Japan
| 
|-
| Win
| align=center| 4-0
| Azusa Anzai
| Submission (armbar)
| G-Shooto: G-Shooto 05
| 
| align=center| 1
| align=center| 0:10
| Tokyo, Japan
| 
|-
| Win
| align=center| 3-0
| Mayuko Kasaki
| Submission (guillotine choke)
| G-Shooto: Plus05
| 
| align=center| 1
| align=center| 4:37
| Tokyo, Japan
| 
|-
| Win
| align=center| 2-0
| Haruka Onuki
| Submission (rear-naked choke)
| Smackgirl 2005: Dynamic!!
| 
| align=center| 1
| align=center| 4:12
| Tokyo, Japan
| 
|-
| Win
| align=center| 1-0
| Kazumi Sakaguchi
| Submission (guillotine choke)
| Smackgirl: Third Season II
| 
| align=center| 1
| align=center| 1:09
| Tokyo, Japan
|

See also
List of female mixed martial artists

References

External links

Profile at Fightergirls.com
Official blog 
Official blog at Bodymaker 
Official blog (old) 
Official blog (old) 

1979 births
Living people
Japanese female mixed martial artists
Mixed martial artists utilizing wrestling
Japanese arm wrestlers
Japanese female professional wrestlers
Japanese gravure idols
Sportspeople from Tokyo
Japanese bisexual people
Bisexual sportspeople
Bisexual women
Japanese LGBT sportspeople
LGBT mixed martial artists
LGBT professional wrestlers
LGBT arm wrestlers
Female arm wrestlers